The Zaramo people, also referred to as Dzalamo or Saramo, are a Bantu ethnic group native to the central coast of Tanzania, particularly  Dar es Salaam Region and Pwani Region. They are the largest ethnic group in and around Dar es Salaam, the former capital of Tanzania and the 7th largest city in Africa. Estimated to be about 0.7 million people, over 98% of them are Muslims, more specifically the Shafi'i school of Sunni Islam. Their culture and history have been shaped by their dwelling in both urban and rural landscapes.

Origin 
By oral tradition, the Zaramo are said to be descendants of the Shomvi people under the lead of the warrior-hero, Pazi in the early 19th century. The Shomvi, a mercantile clan living in what is present-day Dar Es Salaam were attacked by an offshoot group of Kamba people from Kenya. The Shomvi sought help from the warrior, Pazi, who lived in the hinterlands. When Pazi defeated the Kamba, he asked for salt, cloth, and other luxuries in return. When the Shomvi could not meet his demands, they offered for him and his family to live with them on the coast, where they would receive an annual tribute instead. The war and its results were said to be the founding of the Zaramo.

Language
The original Zaramo language, sometimes called Kizaramo, is Bantu, belonging to the Niger-Congo family of languages. However, in contemporary Tanzania, only a few speak it, and most speak Swahili language as their first language, as it is the trading language of the East African coast and the national language of Tanzania.

Kizaramo is still used in many Zaramo rituals, such as the mwali rites, though they often appear alongside Swahili translations.

Society
The term, "Zaramo," in scholarly studies also reflects a macro-ethnic group. The larger Zaramo group consists of Zaramo proper, but includes a number of related peoples such as the Kaguru, Kwere, Kutu, Kami, Sagara, Luguru, Ngulu and Vidunda peoples.

The Zaramo society has been historically victimized by slave raids and slave trading by the Swahili-Arab traders of Zanzibar. To resist this persecution, they developed stockade-fortified villages. Many ran away from the coast, and would return during the daytime to farm and fish. Zanzibar Arabs, state William Worger, Nancy Clark and Edward Alpers, however pursued their slave raiding into the mainland, where they would seize pagan Zaramo adults and children, gag them so they would not cry out, and then sell them to the traders. Sometimes during famines, such as in the 19th-century rule of Barghash bin Said of Zanzibar, desperate Zaramo people pawned and sold each other to survive.

The Zaramo society's history has long been influenced by the coastal encounter between the Arab-Persian and African populations typical of East Africa, since the 8th century. During the colonial era, the influence came from the encounter between the African people, Arab-Swahili trader intermediaries and the European powers, but it broadly coopted the older slave-driven, social stratification model.

According to Elke Stockreiter – a professor of History specializing on Africa, the slaves seized from Zaramo people and other ethnic groups such as Yao, Makonde and Nyamwezi peoples from the mainland and brought to the coastal Tanzania region and Zanzibar sought social inclusion and attempted to reduce their treatment as inferiors by their slave owners by adopting and adapting to Islam in the 19th century. Conversion to Islam among the coastal Zaramo people began in the 19th century. These historic events, states Stockreiter, have influenced the politics and inter-ethnic relations in 20th-century Tanzania.

Initiation 
Initiation rituals are required for the youth of the Zaramo people to become full-fledged members of adult society. Theses rituals generally happen around puberty and the female's first menses.

Males 
The male ceremony is termed as nhulu or "growth." The initiation process takes place during the dry season and about once every three years. Each novice, mwali, have a designated instructor, mhunga, who guides the youth through the circumcision process, teaches Zaramo sex lore and practice. Once the mwali are circumcised, they are brought to an initiation hut, kumbi, where they are taught, and then are not permitted to bathe for two weeks. Once the mwali are allowed to bathe again, their mothers in the village hold a village dance, mbiga. After eight more days the mwali return to the village and their instructors burn the kumbi and anything else related to the initiation. The mwali are now men of society and celebrate with mlao, a dance of emergence.

Females 
Female initiation begins with a girl's first menses. The rituals associated with female initiation are performed to protect and enrich a girl's female power and her fertility. A girl has a reproductive cycle within society-one that starts with her first menses, continues to her initiation, marriage, birth of her children, and finally ends with the puberty of her grandchildren, at which point her reproductive cycle is over. The girl novice, also called mwali, is secluded in her mother's house for anywhere between two weeks and one year. Earlier documentation states that this process in the past could have taken up to five years. The mwali's paternal aunt is usually assigned as her shangazi, or the one who takes over the mwali's teachings and ceremonies. The initiate is taught domestic responsibilities such as housekeeping, childcare, sexual and moral behavior, and mature interaction in society. During seclusion, the mwali is not allowed to speak, work, or go outside, to symbolize her death and put emphasis on her re-emergence as symbolic birth. She is then carried to a mkole tree where is circumcised as well by an operator, or mnhunga. She is then returned to her family and she is celebrated with an mbwelo dance.

Mwana Hiti Figures (in Regards to Mwali) 
Mwana Hiti figures may also be referred to as mwana nya kiti, mwana nya nhiti, or mwana mkongo. These names stem from mwana, meaning "child," and nya kiti and nya nhiti meaning "wood" and "chair." Mkongo refers to the mkongo tree, of which many mwana hiti are carved from. All of these names refer to the mwana hiti as a "child of wood." Mwana hiti may be represented in other forms besides figures such as walking sticks, staff, stool, musical instruments, and grave posts among others. Mwana hiti don't belong to individuals, but to families, and they are passed down generations, sometimes up to 40 or 50 years.

Appearance 
Mwana hiti are usually made of wood, however some Zaramo traditions say they should be made of gourds as gourds are symbols of fertility. Sizes of the mwana hiti vary, the average being around 10 centimeters. They can be projections of a child, a woman with a child, or an mwali. Mwana hiti are cylindrical figures with depictions of a head and torso of relatively equal size and usually no arms, legs or genitalia. Breasts and a navel are often present as well as hair. Facial features are simple and abstract, occasionally not being present. These figures may be decorated with metal (if hair is present) or white beads as jewelry.

Function 
Mwali hiti are meant to spark a "nurturing consciousness" within the mwali to instill a desire to have children. They also act as the main socializing for the mwali during her seclusion, measuring her skills as a future mother and teaching her the responsibilities of womanhood (i.e. taking care of oneself and children.)

Mwali must treat the mwana hiti as her child, bathing it, oiling it, dressing the hair (of which the mwali wears the same style,) and feeding it. If she fails to complete these motherly tasks she may be denied fertility in the future. Fertility is prized in Zaramo culture as children are seen as economic and cultural goals for prosperity and legacy.

If a woman encounters fertility after her initiation is over, she may choose to repeat seclusion and mwana hiti rites. This means the mwana hiti can also double as a tambiko, or "sacrifice," as a means to create stronger ties with the spiritual world.

Creating mwana hiti 
Men are the carvers of mwana hiti, many creating reputations for their highly sought after figures. Mwana hiti are only commissioned, and there can't be more than one figure commissioned by a family at a time. Carvers also cannot create mwali hiti if a family already possesses one. The carver creates mwana hiti out of one piece of wood (or gourd) that he picks out, though any decorations for hair or jewelry must be provided by the family.

Culture and Livelihood
The Zaramo people have borrowed from the general Swahili and the once-occupying Arab culture in terms of dress such as wearing a skull cap, Islamic festivals and Muslim observances, but they continue some of their pre-Islam traditions such as matrilineal kinship, while a few pursue the Kolelo fertility cult and the worship of their ancient deity Mulungu. The traditional practice of Mganga or medicine man, along with Muslim clerics offering services as divine healers, remains popular among the impoverished Zaramo communities.

The Zaramo people are settled farmers who also keep livestock and fish, but they also are migrant workers to Tanzania's capital city and tourist sites, considering business, or biashara, their job. They live in pangone or shanty clusters of villages. They produce staple foods such as rice, millet, maize, sorghum, and cassava, as well as cash crops such as coconuts, legumes, cashews, pineapples, oranges, and bananas. Cassava is important to Zaramo agriculture because it can grow with very little rain.

For Zaramo people who live on the coast, fishing is also popular for both personal consumption and trade. Some Zaramo may also choose to brew beer, make chacoal, or dig for copal for a living. Those with specialized professions, mafundi, or as healers and diviners, mganga, rarely work those positions full time, often working agriculturally to supplement.

Formation of United Republic of Tanzania (Tanzanian Independence) 
The independence of Tanganyika in 1961 and the Zanzibar Archipelago in 1963 and their subsequent formation of the United Republic of Tanzania led to a significant shift in Tanzanian culture, as well as the Zaramo culture. In 1963, 132 chiefs and headmen were removed from their political positions as government executives. The decreased status of chiefs and headmen has led to the dwindling of their numbers and traditions associated with them.

Death 
Zaramo people hold their dead with high respect and reverence. They believe that life is continued into death, in which the spirits of the dead, mizimu, only bring misfortune upon the living. Illness, death, infertility, and poor agriculture can all be attributed to the spitefulness of mizimu. Tambiko are funeral rites where the family clean the grave and offer food and drink to each other and the deceased. Sometimes a temporary hut is built around the grave to act as a shrine. After Tanzanian independence in the 1960s, an increasing number of Zaramo people have requested to be buried in their home villages on private land or on church grounds.

Grave Markers 
The influence of Islam and the increase of urbanization and literacy have been marked as responsible for the decline in traditional Zaramo figure grave posts. The majority of contemporary grave markers are slab markers with written sentiments and notifiers. Decreasing land availability in Dar Es Salaam has led to an increase in unmarked grave sites holding multiple bodies, which has resulted in a higher importance being placed upon sufficient grave marking.

Traditional Zaramo grave figures have a variety of names: mwana hiti (no longer in contemporary use,) nguzo za makaburi (translated to "grave posts,") mashahidi wa makaburi (translated to "grave witness.") These figures are considered witnesses or representation of the deceased. Mwana hiti grave figures are separate from mwana hiti initiation figures, and were mainly used for headmen or chief graves. Sometimes grave markers are created as marionette-like, wooden puppets called motto wa bandia to become mnemonic honorary devices.

Prestige Staffs 
Staffs, aside from their use as walking supports, are used as ritual aids, titular symbols, and representations of power. Specific staffs are usual signifiers of chiefs, diviners, and linguists.

Kifimbo Staffs 
Literally translated to "small stick," kifimbo staffs are small staffs used mainly for military authority. It is either held in the hand or tucked between the upper arm and the torso. Kifimbo hold no functional use, and are considered purely symbolic.

Kome Staffs 
Traditional kome staffs are tall staffs made from blackwood (mpingo) and are carved to possess animal and human (women) decoration. Mwana hiti were common top decorations before Tanzanian independence. Kome staffs are typically associated with chief power, and so their decreased presence is directly correlated to that of chiefs in Tanzania.

Pottery

Usage 
By early-mid 20th century, much of Zaramo pottery consisted of internal creations and imports from Europe, Japan, and India. Most of Zaramo pottery consists of ceramic water jars and earthenware cooking pots and dishes. Pottery is generally made for kitchen-use, thus resulting in two main types/uses: vessels for liquid (narrow-rimmed) and vessels for cooking and serving food (open and curved rims.)

Cooking dishes may range from 5-12 inches in diameter and 2-3 inches in height, usually topped with an open, flared rim. General cooking pots are called chungu, while dishes made specifically for the act of frying are called kaango or kikaango (depending on size), with smaller bowls being referred to as bakuli. Chetezo or Kitezo are shallow dishes made to be placed on shrine pedestals to hold incense offerings.

Mtungi are large pots, sometimes reaching 2 feet high, that are made particularly to hold water for bathing and drinking; a household generally has two of these vessels, one for each use. Sometimes mtungi are replaced with buckets or oil drums, the manufactured alternatives being more durable, though they keep the water less cool. Mtungi tend to have more fragile necks prone to cracking and chipping.

There is not much distinction between pottery for everyday use and pottery for rituals, such as ceremonial mwali bathing, healing rituals, and grave offerings. Everyday pottery may be used, though many ceremonies require the vessel to be new.

Process 
The majority of potters in Zaramo culture are women, who are called fundi wa kufinyanga or "masters of making pottery." Pottery is seen as a job that complements the agricultural and domestic responsibilities assigned to women. Apart from most of Africa, Zaramo women do not sell their pottery in markets, instead operating on an order/commission system. While any women may choose to practice pottery, many women are taught by older relatives when they are mwali, a time when girls are secluded in the home and normally learn domestic skills. Pottery is a physically strenuous task, which is the main reason a woman may retire from the practice.

Good clay is the most essential part of Zaramo pottery, with many potters choosing to mix several types of clay to achieve maximum durability through the firing process. A pottery wheel is not used; instead, "pinch pot" techniques (generally for smaller vessels) and coiling methods (generally for larger vessels) are used. After being formed, the pottery are left to dry out for 2–7 days before being fired, not in a kiln, but a wood fire. The vessels are placed on top of a fire, and more wood and plant material are placed on top of the vessels. Firing lasts 2–3 hours. If the pottery is to be colored, they are colored directly after firing.

Finish and Ornamentation 
The bodies of vessels are burnished using seeds, metal, stones or shells, while necks/rims are smoothed with leaves or paper.

Color is added directly after firing and mostly consists of reds and blacks. Red pigment is made from either the boiling of the mzingifuri plant (where the vessel is dipped into the pigment) or from the heating of kitahoymse grass seeds (which are turned into a solid mass that is then rubbed onto a just-fired vessel to transfer pigment.) Black pigment is made from powdering tree bark (usually mango tree bark) and mixing it with water or citrus juice.

Ornamentation of pottery is appreciated in Zaramo culture, but is not integral. Decoration is either incised (using millet stalks, bamboo, or shells) or painted on. Lids, or funiko, aren't incised, only painted. Biiki are comb-like tools made to create incised parallel lines. All incised decorations are called marembo or mapambo, but there are specific names for other patterns such as huku na huku (zig-zag,) mistari (vertical lines,) and ukumbuo (horizontal lines).

Basketry

Usage 
Basketry is a very common practice in Zaramo and Tanzanian culture and can be broken down into several types.

Pakacha are baskets that are made for only a day or two's use. They are made of fresh palm leaves and are often used to transport small amounts of items/wares, whether for travel or for the marketplace. They are disposable and are made by common people, not specialists. Tenga are larger sturdier versions of pakacha. They are made to carry heavy loads and are, therefore, made with bamboo instead of palm leaves. Ungo (food and winnowing trays) and kikota (small beer vessels)  also use bamboo, though it is more tightly woven.

Kawa are decorated food covers made from wild date palms called mkindu. They are often decorated with Swahili proverbs, fruits, vegetables, and flowers. Similar to kawa are fans called vipepeo. Types of mats include mkeka (large rectangular mats for sitting,) msala (oval prayer mats,) jamvi (large, sturdy mats for porch covering,) vitanga (smaller, ovular versions of jamvi,) and kumba (matting for fences and walls.)

Process 
Basketry is created using mainly bamboo, dwara palm leaves, and date palm leaves. The plant fibers are then put into plaits, of which there are many different types such as jicho la kuku for "eye of the chicken," pacha for "crossroads," and vinyota as "stars." Once the plant fibers are plaited into long strips, they are sewn together to create the desired basketry shape. Basketry used to be sewn together with coconut fibers, but today it is more common to use twine or plastic from bags. Many baskets are designated to be natural in color, though some are dyed. Dying of baskets, if done, is usually in black or red-orange made from roots of the mdaa plant or berries of the mzingefuri respectively. The only tools needed are a paring knife and a needle or an awl.

While anyone can learn to make basketry, it is usually taught through family. Basketry-makers are called fundi kusuka, "masters of plaiting." Basketry, like pottery, is considered a part-time job only. It is typical for men to handle weaving that uses bamboo and for women to do the weaving that uses palm leaves. Men usually perform the decorating.

See also

Kimbamanduka (fl. 19th-century) Tanzanian elephant hunter, warrior, pazi (chief) of the Zaramo people
Swahili people

References

External links
 Information page with particular reference Zaramo art

Ethnic groups in Tanzania